A bow window or compass window is a curved bay window. Bow windows are designed to create space by projecting beyond the exterior wall of a building, and to provide a wider view of the garden or street outside and typically combine four or more windows, which join to form an arch, differentiating them from the more common and often three-sided bay window. Casement windows are often used.

Bow windows first appeared in the eighteenth century in the United Kingdom, (and in the Federal period in the United States).

White's Club, in St. James's Street, London, features a famous bow window.

See also
 Oriel window
 Bay window

References

External links
Oriel Bow Window from Brighton & Hove Museums collection
The Difference Between Bay & Bow Windows

Windows